Taperina is a genus of harvestmen in the family Sclerosomatidae.

Species
 Taperina lutea Roewer, 1953
 Taperina nigripes Roewer, 1953

References

Harvestmen
Harvestman genera